The Men's two-man bobsleigh competition at the 1984 Winter Olympics in Sarajevo, Yugoslavia was held on 10 and 11 February, at the Sarajevo Olympic Bobsleigh and Luge Track on the mountain of Trebević. This was one of two bobsleigh events at these games.

Results

27 of the 28 two-man teams entered for the event completed all four runs

References

External links
Official Olympic Report
Sport Statistics - International Competitions Archive

Bobsleigh at the 1984 Winter Olympics